John-Paul Kelly, known as J.P. Kelly, is a professional poker player from Aylesbury, England. Kelly is a two time World Series of Poker bracelet winner, having won the 2009 World Series of Poker $1,500 Pot Limit Hold'em event in Las Vegas and then later that same year won another bracelet at the 2009 World Series of Poker Europe in the £1,000 No Limit Hold'em event in London. He was a member of team PokerStars Pro, playing under the screen name "jp Kelly" However, his association with PokerStars has since ended.

As of July 2017, his total live tournament winnings exceed $2,800,000.

World Series of Poker bracelets 

An "E" following a year denotes bracelet(s) won at the World Series of Poker Europe

Notes

External links
PokerNews.com - JP Kelly - Interview with UK Bracelet Winner John Paul Kelly

Living people
World Series of Poker bracelet winners
English poker players
Year of birth missing (living people)